Medstead is a village in the Canadian province of Saskatchewan within the Rural Municipality of Medstead No. 497 and Census Division No. 16.

History 
Medstead incorporated as a village on April 23, 1931.

Demographics 

See also 
 List of communities in Saskatchewan
 Villages of Saskatchewan

References

Villages in Saskatchewan
Medstead No. 497, Saskatchewan
Division No. 16, Saskatchewan